Samuel S. Koenig (September 7, 1872 Kingdom of Hungary – March 1955 Manhattan, New York City) was an American lawyer and politician.

Life
He came to the United States as a small boy with his parents, and they settled in New York City. He attended the public schools until the age of 13, then went to work as a clerk. While working by day, he studied law in the evening, and graduated from New York University Law School in 1896.

In 1891, he entered Republican politics as a campaigner for Jacob Sloat Fassett who was defeated in his run for governor. From then on he was continuously involved in ward politics, eventually becoming the Leader in the Sixth Ward, and managed to get Republican Gustave Hartman elected to the New York State Assembly in 1904 and 1905 in a heavily Democratic district.

He was a presidential elector in 1900.

He was Secretary of State of New York from 1909 to 1910, elected in 1908 but defeated for re-election in 1910.

He was a delegate to the 1908, 1912, 1916, 1924, 1928, 1932, 1936, 1940, 1944, 1948 and 1952 Republican National Conventions. From 1915 to 1933, he was Chairman of the New York County Republican Committee. In 1930, he was a member of the New York State Republican Committee. He was a delegate to the New York State convention to ratify the 21st Amendment in 1933.

He died at his home at 107 West 86th Street in Manhattan, and was buried at the Union Field Cemetery in Ridgewood, Queens.

His brother Morris Koenig was appointed a city magistrate of New York City in 1915.

References

Sources
 Political Graveyard
 The Booker T. Washington papers, p. 559
 Presentation of the candidate for state office, in NYT on October 4, 1908
 His brother's appointment, in NYT on June 29, 1915

1872 births
1955 deaths
American people of Hungarian-Jewish descent
Austro-Hungarian emigrants to the United States
Jewish American state legislators in New York (state)
Secretaries of State of New York (state)
New York (state) Republicans
1900 United States presidential electors